A partial lunar eclipse will take place on Friday 28 August 2026. The moon will be almost be inside the umbra, but not quite be contained within the umbral shadow at greatest eclipse.

This lunar eclipse follows the total solar eclipse of 12 August 2026.

This eclipse is the fourth and last of an almost tetrad, with others being 14 Mar 2025 (T), 07 Sep 2025 (T) and 03 Mar 2026 (T). In this almost tetrad, it's the only partial lunar eclipse. An almost tetrad occurs when has four consecutive lunar eclipses that has an umbral eclipse magnitude of 0.9 or greater without lunar eclipses that has an umbral eclipse magnitude of 0.89999 or smaller.

Visibility
It will be completely visible over South and eastern North America, will be seen rising over the rest of North America, and setting over Africa and Europe.

Related eclipses

Eclipses in 2026
 An annular solar eclipse on 17 February.
 A total lunar eclipse on 3 March.
 A total solar eclipse on 12 August.
 A partial lunar eclipse on 28 August.

Lunar year series

Saros series

Metonic series

Half-Saros cycle
A lunar eclipse will be preceded and followed by solar eclipses by 9 years and 5.5 days (a half saros). This lunar eclipse is related to two total solar eclipses of Solar Saros 145.

Tzolkinex 
 Preceded: Lunar eclipse of 16 July 2019

 Followed: Lunar eclipse of 8 October 2033

See also
List of lunar eclipses and List of 21st-century lunar eclipses

Notes

External links
Saros cycle 138

2026-08
2026-08
2026 in science